The Saint-Romain-de-Colbosc tramway was a tramway system serving the city of Saint-Romain-de-Colbosc, France. 

Inaugurated in 1896, the network ran out of money following World War I and was closed in 1929.

References

Tram transport in France
Transport in Normandy
Seine-Maritime